Cape Lookout can refer to:

Cape Lookout (North Carolina), in the United States
Cape Lookout (Oregon), in the United States
Cape Lookout (South Shetland Islands)